Wander refers to jitter frequences below 10 Hz.

Wander may also refer to:

Wander AG, a Swiss food company
Wander (name), a given name
Wander (film), a 2020 American film starring Aaron Eckhart
Wander (1974 video game)
Wander (2015 video game)
Wander (Wander Over Yonder), a fictional character
Wander (Shadow of the Colossus), a fictional character

See also

Wanderer (disambiguation)
Wandering (disambiguation)
Wonder (disambiguation)
Wanderlust (disambiguation)